The Botanic Garden Zuidas (Dutch: Botanische tuin Zuidas) is a botanical garden belonging to Vrije Universiteit in Amsterdam, Netherlands. It was established in 1967 for the purpose of education and research for the Biology faculty. Since 1988, the garden no longer has an educational function, but the property is still owned and supported by the university.

The collection includes about 10,000 species, such as varieties of hardy ferns, cacti and succulents. There is also a collection of carnivorous plants and orchids. The garden also accommodates a collection of trees, shrubs and tub plants, among other things.

There is international collaboration with over 500 botanical gardens and numerous Biblical gardens worldwide.

The garden's existence was threatened in 2009, when plans for an expansion of the university hospital called for it to be removed. In 2010, after widespread popular protest, the VU announced the garden could remain. Since then, the hospital has changed its building plans and will now construct its new buildings around the garden, with the garden itself acting as a courtyard. The garden's accessibility will be improved so that hospital patients will be able to enjoy it.

In 2016 the garden changed its name from Hortus Botanicus Vrije Universiteit Amsterdam (which was often abbreviated to VU-Hortus) to its current name, after the better known Zuidas development area it is in.

References

External links
Official website

Botanical gardens in the Netherlands
Parks in Amsterdam
Vrije Universiteit Amsterdam
Amsterdam-Zuid